"Chase" (also known as "The Chase") is a 1978 instrumental composition by Italian music producer Giorgio Moroder. It was released as a single during 1978 from his Academy Award-winning soundtrack album Midnight Express (1978), and was a disco instrumental that was subsequently extended and released as a maxi single. It made the Billboard Hot 100 in January 1979, peaking at number 33, and the UK Singles Chart, peaking at number 48.

Background
Created especially for the film Midnight Express, Alan Parker, the director of the film, explicitly asked Moroder for a song in the style of "I Feel Love", which Moroder composed for Donna Summer. It was Moroder's second time composing a movie soundtrack after his work on 1972's German softcore sex film "Sex Life in a Convent". The song's main melody was played on a Roland SH-2000 synthesizer, while the bass lines were played on a Minimoog synthesizer. The track also has a flanging effect produced by the MXR Flanger, while other instruments used include an ARP/Solina String Ensemble, Fender Rhodes, Hohner Clavinet, and piano.

Although a disco piece, "Chase", along with "I Feel Love", is more specifically considered the pioneering introduction of the hi-NRG genre, which came to prominence in the early 1980s. The music was arranged by Harold Faltermeyer under the leadership of Giorgio Moroder.

Reception
Pitchfork named it the 175th best song of the 1970s, saying, "Any time someone describes a piece of music as 'cinematic,' there’s a decent chance they’re thinking, consciously or subconsciously, of 'Chase'. It's impossible to overstate, let alone list, the amount of composers and films who've ripped off 'Chase'."

Track listing
 Casablanca — NBD 20146 — single-sided 12"

 Casablanca — NBD 956 — 7" single

Charts

Original version

Giorgio Moroder vs. Jam & Spoon version

References

External links

Giorgio Moroder songs
1978 singles
1970s instrumentals
Pop instrumentals
Songs written for films
Coast to Coast AM
Songs written by Giorgio Moroder
Song recordings produced by Giorgio Moroder
CBS Sports
1978 songs
Casablanca Records singles